Garfield is an unincorporated community in Mahoning County, in the U.S. state of Ohio.

History
Garfield was laid out in 1875 when the Pennsylvania Railroad was extended to that point. The community was named after James A. Garfield, an Ohio legislator and afterward 20th President of the United States. An early variant name was Garfield Station. A post office called Garfield was established in 1899, and remained in operation until 1958.

References

Unincorporated communities in Mahoning County, Ohio
1875 establishments in Ohio
Populated places established in 1875
Unincorporated communities in Ohio